Judge Norris may refer to:

Alan Eugene Norris (born 1935), judge of the United States Court of Appeals for the Sixth Circuit
Mark Norris (judge) (born 1955), judge of the United States District Court for the Western District of Tennessee
William Albert Norris (1927–2017), judge of the United States Court of Appeals for the Ninth Circuit